The Ram in a Thicket is a pair of figures excavated at Ur, in southern Iraq, which date from about 2600–2400 BC. One is in the Mesopotamia Gallery in Room 56 of the British Museum in London; the other is in the University of Pennsylvania Museum in Philadelphia, USA.

Discovery
The pair of rams would more correctly be described as goats, and were discovered lying close together in the 'Great Death Pit' (PG 1237), one of the graves in the Royal Cemetery at Ur, by archaeologist Leonard Woolley during the 1928–9 season. Woolley was in charge of the joint venture between the British Museum and the University of Pennsylvania, which began in 1922. The figure's partner is in the University of Pennsylvania Museum of Archaeology and Anthropology in Philadelphia.

Woolley named the figure the 'Ram in a Thicket' after the story of the binding of Isaac in Genesis 22.13, in which God orders Abraham to sacrifice his son Isaac, but at the last moment an angel stops him and reveals a ram caught in a thicket by its horns, which Abraham sacrifices instead.

The figure

When it was discovered, the   figure had been crushed flat by the weight of the soil above it and its inner wooden core had decomposed. This wooden core had been finely cut for the face and legs, but the body had been more roughly modelled. Woolley used wax to keep the pieces together as it was excavated, and the figure was gently pressed back into its original shape. The ram's head and legs are layered in gold leaf which had been hammered against the wood and stuck to it with a thin wash of bitumen, while its ears are copper which are now green with verdigris. The horns and the fleece on its shoulders are of lapis lazuli, and the body's fleece is made of shell, attached to a thicker coat of bitumen. The figure's genitals are gold, while its belly was silver plate, now oxidised beyond restoration. The tree is also covered in gold leaf with gold flowers.

The figure stands on a small rectangular base decorated with a mosaic of shell, red limestone and lapis lazuli. The figure was originally attached to the flowering shrub by silver chains around its fetlocks, but these chains have completely corroded away. It is thought that the two figures originally faced each other as confronted animals, and that the tubes going up from their shoulders were used to support something, probably a bowl or similar object.

References

 Leonard Woolley, Ur: the First Phases, Penguin Books, London and New York (1946)
 C.L. Woolley and P.R.S. Moorey, Ur of the Chaldees, revised edition, Ithaca, New York, Cornell University Press, (1982)
 H.W.F. Saggs, Babylonians, The British Museum Press, London (1995)
 D. Collon, Ancient Near Eastern Art, The British Museum Press, London (1995)
 C.L. Woolley and others, Ur Excavations, Vol. II: The Royal Cemetery,  The British Museum Press, London (1934)

External links
The Ram in a Thicket on the British Museum website
Penn Museum's Ram in the Thicket Collection highlight

Sumerian art and architecture
Middle Eastern sculptures in the British Museum
Gold objects
Individual hardstone carvings
Goats in art
Animal sculptures
Sculpture of the Ancient Near East
Ur
 
Ancient art in metal